The LG V60 ThinQ 5G, commonly referred to as the LG V60, is an Android phablet manufactured by LG Electronics as part of the LG V series. It was announced in February 2020 and is the successor to the LG V50 ThinQ. On April 5, 2021 LG announced it will be shutting down its mobile phone division and ceasing production of all remaining devices. LG noted the phone will be available until existing inventory runs out.

Specifications

Design and Hardware
Anodized aluminum is used for the frame, however the edges are chamfered unlike the V50. Gorilla Glass 5 is present on the front, while Gorilla Glass 6 is on the back. The camera module protrudes slightly from the back like on the V40, and the flash is no longer separate, while the rear-mounted fingerprint sensor has been replaced with an under-screen optical unit. On the front, the dual cameras of the V40 and V50 have been omitted in favor of a singular front-facing camera, which reduces the size of the display notch. The V60 is available in Classy Blue or Classy White; the IP68 rating is retained. The device uses the Snapdragon 865 processor with the Adreno 650 GPU, and supports 5G. It is available with 8 GB of LPDDR5 RAM and 128 GB or 256 GB of UFS 3.0 storage. MicroSD card expansion is supported through a hybrid single-SIM slot, up to 2 TB with a single-SIM. The P-OLED display is larger than the V50's at 6.8 inches (172.7mm) and has a wider 20.5:9 aspect ratio, but the resolution has been lowered to 1080p from 1440p. The display supports Wacom AES active pen input, but no pen is included and there is no built in storage for one. To compete with folding smartphones, the device offers a case accessory known as "LG DualScreen", which contains a second, 6.8-inch 1080p display panel. It is connected and powered through the USB type-C connector of the phone, and also supports active pen input. While the DualScreen is being used, the phone can still be charged wired with an included magnetic charging tip. Stereo speakers are present with active noise cancellation and a 3.5mm audio jack. The battery is larger at 5000mAh, and can be recharged either wired over USB-C (Quick Charge 4.0+) or wirelessly (Qi). A triple camera setup is used on the rear, consisting of a 64 MP wide sensor, a 13 MP ultrawide sensor and a time-of-flight 3D depth sensor. There is no telephoto sensor like on the V40 and V50; LG claims that the high resolution of the wide sensor can shoot lossless zoom photos. The rear camera can now record video at 8K resolution at 26fps. The front-facing camera is 10 MP and can now record 4K video at 60 frames per second.

Software
The V60 ships with Android 10 and uses LG's UX 9.

References

LG Electronics smartphones
LG Electronics mobile phones
Mobile phones introduced in 2020
Android (operating system) devices
Mobile phones with multiple rear cameras
Mobile phones with 8K video recording
Dual screen phone